Olavius finitimus is a species of oligochaete worm, first found in Belize, on the Caribbean side of Central America.

References

Further reading
Diaz, Robert J., and Christer Erseus. "Habitat preferences and species associations of shallow-water marine Tubificidae (Oligochaeta) from the barrier reef ecosystems off Belize, Central America." Aquatic Oligochaete Biology V. Springer Netherlands, 1994. 93-105.
Giere, Olav, et al. "A comparative structural study on bacterial symbioses of Caribbean gutless Tubificidae (Annelida, Oligochaeta)." Acta zoologica 76.4 (1995): 281–290.
Dubilier, Nicole, Anna Blazejak, and Caroline Rühland. "Symbioses between bacteria and gutless marine oligochaetes." Molecular Basis of Symbiosis. Springer Berlin Heidelberg, 2006. 251–275.

External links
WORMS

Tubificina